Edith Hall,  (born 1959) is a British scholar of classics, specialising in ancient Greek literature and cultural history, and professor in the Department of Classics and Centre for Hellenic Studies at King's College, London. She is a Fellow of the British Academy. From 2006 until 2011 she held a Chair at Royal Holloway, University of London, where she founded and directed the Centre for the Reception of Greece and Rome until November 2011. She resigned over a dispute regarding funding for classics after leading a public campaign, which was successful, to prevent cuts to or the closure of the Royal Holloway Classics department. She also co-founded and is Consultant Director of the Archive of Performances of Greek and Roman Drama at Oxford University, Chair of the Gilbert Murray Trust, and Judge on the Stephen Spender Prize for poetry translation.  Her prizewinning doctoral thesis was awarded at Oxford. In 2012 she was awarded a Humboldt Research Prize to study ancient Greek theatre in the Black Sea, and in 2014 she was elected to the Academy of Europe. She lives in Cambridgeshire.

Overview

Edith Hall studied for a BA degree in Classics & Modern Languages after winning a Major Scholarship to Wadham College, Oxford (awarded with First Class Honours in 1982) and a DPhil degree at St Hugh's College, Oxford (awarded in 1988). She was Leverhulme Chair of Greek Cultural History at the Durham University, Fellow of Somerville College, Oxford, and visiting chairs at several North American institutions.

Known for her humorous style of lecturing, Hall has made many television and radio appearances, as well as acting as consultant for professional theatre productions by the National Theatre, Shakespeare's Globe, the Royal Shakespeare Company, Live Theatre in Newcastle, and Theatercombinat in Germany. In February 2014 she appeared on BBC2 Newsnight and recited a newly discovered poem of Sappho in ancient Greek as the credits rolled. Her central research interests are in ancient Greek literature, especially Homer, tragedy, comedy, satyr drama, ancient literary criticism and rhetoric, Herodotus and Xenophon, although her publications discuss many other ancient authors including Lucian, Plutarch, Artemidorus, Menander, Thucydides, Plato and Aristotle, and other ancient evidence including metre and versification, papyri, painted pottery and inscriptions. She is also an expert on classical reception – the ways in which ancient culture and history have informed later epochs, whether in later antiquity or modernity, and whether in fiction, drama, cinema, poetry, political theory, or philosophy. Her research has been influential in three distinct areas: (1) the understanding of the performance of literature in the ancient theatre and its role in society, (2) the representation of ethnicity;  (3) the uses of Classical culture in European education, identity, and political theory.

She has stated that Aristophanes is the person she would most like to meet from the ancient world.

She was elected as a Fellow of the British Academy in 2022.

Ancient theatre and society 
Several of her books argue that theatre plays an important role in intellectual and cultural history, especially because entertainments reach lower-status audiences. These include Greek and Roman Actors (2002, with Professor Pat Easterling), and The Theatrical Cast of Athens (2006), which incorporates a revisiting of Inventing the Barbarian in the light of developments in international history since 1989. New Directions in Ancient Pantomime (2008), the first study of the balletic performance of mythological narratives which educated mass audiences across the ancient Mediterranean world for several centuries, was praised by D. Feeney, Prof. of Latin at Princeton University, as  'indispensable for all students of the Roman Empire.' Her book, Greek Tragedy: Suffering under the Sun, argues that Greek tragedy is a deeply philosophical medium, includes an essay on every surviving ancient Greek tragedy and has been described as 'admirably exhaustive'. Her 2013 book Adventures with Iphigenia in Tauris: A Cultural History of Euripides' Black Sea Tragedy is a detailed history of the impact of an often neglected tragedy by Euripides, covering its presence in vase-painting, Aristotle, Latin poetry, Pompeian murals, Roman imperial sarcophagi and literature including the ancient novel and Lucianic dialogue.

When a lecturer at Oxford in 1996 she co-founded, with Oliver Taplin, the interdisciplinary APGRD (Archive of Performances of Greek and Roman Drama). The project collects and analyses materials related to the staging and influence of classical plays. The project's ten co-edited volumes, of which Hall is lead editor of seven and contributor to nine, have been described as playing 'a pivotal role in establishing the parameters and methodologies of the study of the reception of Classical drama in performance'. The most substantial book to emerge from the project is the 220,000-word Greek Tragedy and the British Theatre 1660–1914, co-authored with Professor Fiona Macintosh, which in 2006 was shortlisted for both the Theatre Society Book of the Year Prize (2006), the J.D. Criticos prize and the Runciman Prize.

From 1996 to 2003, Hall contributed to the Oxford World's Classics Euripides series, which included all nineteen of Euripides’ extant plays, newly translated by James Morwood and Robin Waterfield. Hall provided the introductions to each of the five volumes, drawing out the modern parallels with the texts. In the introduction to Bacchae and Other Plays, she explored Euripides’ supposed ‘radicalism’, quoting the critic F. L. Lucas: “not Ibsen, not Voltaire, not Tolstoi ever forged a keener weapon in defence of womanhood, in defiance of superstition, in denunciation of war, than the Medea, the Ion , the Trojan Women .”

Representation of ethnicity
Hall's first monograph, Inventing the Barbarian (1989), argued that ancient European identity relied on the stereotyping as 'other' of an Asiatic enemy. Her argument that ancient ideas about ethnicity underlie modern questions of nationalism, racism and ethnic self-determination has been extremely influential in Classics, and regarded as 'seminal' by scholars in other fields. This work was developed in her scholarly commentary on the Greek text of Aeschylus' Persians, with English translation (1996), and in the essay collection she edited Cultural Responses to the Persian Wars (2007).

Classics and society 
In recent years, Hall's research has also incorporated later Cultural History, especially the social role played by the presence of ancient Greece and Rome. Her books in this area include The Return of Ulysses: a Cultural History of Homer's Odyssey (2008, shortlisted for the Criticos Prize), noted for its scholarship and accessibility. This was followed by two collections of essays on ancient slavery and one on the uses and abuses of Greek and Roman texts and ideas in the relationship between India and Britain 1757–2007.

Hall is the Principal Investigator on The People’s History of Classics, a project which presents and amplifies the voices of British working-class women and men who engaged with ancient Greek and Roman culture between 1789 and 1917. This began as an AHRC-funded research project based at King's College, London, called Classics and Class in Britain 1789-1917.

Hall delivered the J P Barron Memorial Lecture at the Institute of Classical Studies on Wednesday 7 June 2017 on Classicist Foremothers and Why They Matter.

Selected publications 
Inventing the Barbarian: Greek Self-Definition through Tragedy (OUP, 1989)
Sophocles' Antigone, Oedipus the King, Electra (OUP, 1994)
Aeschylus' Persians: Edited with Translation and Commentary (1996)
Medea in Performance (Legenda, 2000)
Dionysus since 69: Greek Tragedy at the Dawn of the Third Millennium (2004)
Greek Tragedy and the British Theatre 1660–1914 (2005, with Fiona Macintosh)
The Theatrical Cast of Athens: Interactions between Ancient Greek Drama & Society (2006)
Agamemnon in Performance (Oxford University Press, 2007)
Cultural Responses to the Persian Wars (OUP, 2007, with Emma Bridges and P. J. Rhodes)
Aristophanes in Performance (Legenda, 2007)
The Return of Ulysses: A Cultural History of Homer's Odyssey (2007)
New Directions in Ancient Pantomime (2008, with Rosie Wyles)
Sophocles and the Greek Tragic Tradition (CUP, 2009, with Simon Goldhill)
Greek Tragedy: Suffering Under the Sun (OUP, 2010)
Theorising Performance (Duckworth, 2010)
Reading Ancient Slavery (Bloomsbury, 2010)
India, Greece and Rome 1757–2007 (Institute of Classical Studies, 2010)
Ancient Slavery and Abolition (Oxford University Press, 2011)
Adventures with Iphigenia in Tauris: A Cultural History of Euripides' Black Sea Tragedy (OUP, 2013)
Introducing the Ancient Greeks: From Bronze Age Seafarers to Navigators of the Western Mind (W. W. Norton, 2014)
Women Classical Scholars: Unsealing the Fountain from the Renaissance to Jacqueline de Romilly (OUP, 2016, with Rosie Wyles)
Aristotle's Way: How ancient wisdom can change your life (The Bodley Head, London, 2018) (Penguin, 2020)

See also 
 Archive of Performances of Greek and Roman Drama (APGRD)

References

External links 
 Edith Hall's Blog The Edithorial
 Edith Hall's Home Page
 APGRD (Archive of Performances of Greek and Roman Drama)
  Edith Hall's AHRC-funded research project Classics & Class in Britain 1789–1939
  Edith Hall's entry on the King's College London website
Classicist Foremothers and Why They Matter - the J P Barron Memorial Lecture at the Institute of Classical Studies delivered by Edith Hall on Wednesday 7 June 2017

1959 births
Living people
Alumni of Wadham College, Oxford
Alumni of St Hugh's College, Oxford
Fellows of Somerville College, Oxford
Fellows of New Hall, Cambridge
Academics of the University of Reading
Classical scholars of the University of Oxford
Academics of Durham University
Academics of Royal Holloway, University of London
British classical scholars
Women classical scholars
Academics of King's College London
Classical scholars of the University of London
Hellenists